Fisher Homestead may refer to:

Fisher Homestead (Lewes, Delaware), listed on the NRHP in Delaware
Fisher Homestead (Cloverport, Kentucky), listed on the NRHP in Kentucky
Adam Fisher Homestead, United, Pennsylvania, listed on the National Register of Historic Places listings in Westmoreland County, Pennsylvania

See also
Fisher House (disambiguation)